The Transformers: Escalation is a six-issue comic book mini-series, published by IDW Publishing, based on the Transformers and following on from The Transformers: Infiltration. The series launched in November 2006 and ended in April 2007. The series is available in The Transformers: Volume 2.

Plot summary

Notes

Beyond Escalation, Furman hopes to have the Headmasters and Predacons appear. He also would like to have the Japanese G1 characters appear at some point. The Transformers: Devastation introduces the multiple Sunstreaker Headmasters and the Predacons had a small role in The Transformers: Stormbringer.

Escalation picks up on several other plot threads introduced in other IDW G1 stories.

In relation to The Transformers: Spotlight

 The Dinobots and Shockwave, dug up here by Skywatch, were buried in Spotlight: Shockwave after a battle between the two ended in both being buried in lava.
 Laserbeak and Ravage were also discovered by Skywatch in Spotlight: Soundwave after a battle between Soundwave and Bludgeon caused the volcano they were in to explode (though only Laserbeak was shown at the time).
 The story of Sixshot and the Reapers was first explored in Spotlight: Sixshot.
 The mysterious face that Prime sees in the limbo realm of "infraspace" is Nova Prime, which is expanded on in the Spotlight: Optimus Prime and referred to in Spotlight: Galvatron.
 Hot Rod and Nightbeat both join Optimus' crew after their perspective Spotlights.  Indeed, Hot Rod still retains the alt-mode from his issue.

In relation to The Transformers: Stormbringer

 Prime's method of defeating Megatron — by causing him to wear out his Ore-13 by exerting himself more — was the same method which led to Thunderwing's defeat in that story, explaining how Prime knows of this weakness.
 Hardhead was part of Optimus' crew, first seen in Stormbringer.

Easter eggs
 In issue 4, the name of the garage that the Machination is using is "Ideas and Design Works" — the full name of Transformers publisher IDW Publishing.
 There are a host of items in the garage referencing various other Transformer lore. These include a poster bearing the words "Kiss Players", leaflets on "Seibertron cars" and the sale of "Binaltech air filters"

Characters

Autobots
Bumblebee 
Hardhead 
Hot Rod 
Ironhide 
Jazz 
Nightbeat 
Optimus Prime 
Prowl 
Ratchet 
Sunstreaker 
Wheeljack

Decepticons
Astrotrain 
Blitzwing 
Megatron 
Runabout 
Runamuck 
Skywarp 
Starscream 
Thundercracker

References

2006 comics debuts
2007 comics endings
Escalation
IDW Publishing titles
Comic book limited series